Rashk-e Olya (also Romanized as Rāshk-e ‘Olyā and Rāshk ‘Olya; also known as Jahāneh, Rāshk-e Bālā, and Rāshk-e Balūţ) is a village in Sornabad Rural District, Hamaijan District, Sepidan County, Fars Province, Iran. At the 2006 census, its population was 742, in 181 families.

References 

Populated places in Sepidan County